Nizhnaya Ilyinovka is a rural locality (a selo) and the administrative center of Nizhneilyinovsky Selsoviet of Mikhaylovsky District, Amur Oblast, Russia. The population was 283 as of 2018. There are 6 streets.

Geography 
Nizhnaya Ilyinovka is located on the left bank of the Dim River, 44 km north of Poyarkovo (the district's administrative centre) by road. Yaroslavka is the nearest rural locality.

References 

Rural localities in Mikhaylovsky District, Amur Oblast